Clauzadea is a genus of lichenized  fungi in the family Lecideaceae. The genus contains four species found in Europe. Clauzadea was circumscribed in 1984 by lichenologists Josef Hafellner and André Bellemère.

The genus name of Clauzadea is in honour of F.J. Georges Clauzade (1914-2002) a French teacher and botanist (Mycology and Lichenology).

Species
Clauzadea chondrodes (A.Massal.) Clauzade & Cl.Roux ex Hafellner & Türk 92001)
Clauzadea immersa (Hoffm.) Hafellner & Bellem. (1984)
Clauzadea metzleri (Körb.) Clauzade & Cl.Roux ex D.Hawksw. (1992)
Clauzadea monticola (Ach.) Hafellner & Bellem. (1984)

References

Lecideales genera
Lichen genera
Taxa named by Josef Hafellner
Lecideales
Taxa described in 1984